The 2019 Football Northern Territory season in Northern Territory. The men's competitions consisted of three major divisions across the State.

League table

2019 NorZone Premier League
The season began on 29 March, concluding with the Grand Final on 28 September.

Finals series

2019 NorZone Division One
The season began on 29 March, concluding with the Grand Final on 22 September.

Finals series

2019 Southern Zone Premier League
The season began on 27 April, concluding with the Grand Final on 7 September.

Notes

Finals series

References

2019 in Australian soccer
Soccer in the Northern Territory